Bloodsport is the name of several supervillains appearing in American comic books published by DC Comics. All of these versions exist in DC's main shared universe, known as the DC Universe.

The Robert DuBois version of Bloodsport made his live-action debut in the television series Supergirl, played by David St. Louis. In the DC Extended Universe, Robert DuBois is played by Idris Elba in the film The Suicide Squad (2021).

Publication history
The character of Robert DuBois, created by writer and artist John Byrne, first appeared in Superman #4 (April 1987) as Bloodsport. The second incarnation, Alexander Trent, made his first appearance in The Adventures of Superman #507 (December 1993) and was created by writer Karl Kesel and artist Barry Kitson. The third incarnation, known as Bloodsport III, made his first appearance in Superman #652 (July 2006) and was created by writers Kurt Busiek and Geoff Johns, and artist Pete Woods. Demolitia, a female version of Bloodsport, is introduced by writer David Michelinie, and artists Kieron Dwyer and Denis Rodier in Action Comics #718 (February 1996), in which she procured Bloodsport's technology.

Fictional character biography

Robert DuBois

Robert DuBois is a Vietnam draft evader, who had a mental breakdown and became obsessed with the Vietnam War after learning that his brother had gone in his stead. DuBois was drafted to serve in the United States Armed Forces. Upon receiving his induction notice, DuBois fled to Canada, not because he was morally opposed to the war, but because he was afraid of death. DuBois' younger brother, Michael, reported for induction in his place, passing himself off as Robert. Michael DuBois was sent into combat in Vietnam, where he lost both his arms and legs. On learning that his brother had lost his limbs, DuBois went insane from guilt.

Robert was finally contacted by individuals in the employment of billionaire Lex Luthor, who sought a pawn to assassinate Luthor's archenemy Superman. Operatives of Luthor, under the direction of a man named Kimberley, played upon DuBois' fixations on Vietnam in order to condition him psychologically to want to kill Superman. They also equipped DuBois with an arsenal of powerful, advanced weapons, including a gun that fired needles of Kryptonite. DuBois then went into action in Metropolis, calling himself Bloodsport. He now claimed that both his brother and he had served in combat in Vietnam and had been injured there. Professing rage at the citizens of Metropolis for wasting the freedom he claimed both his brother and himself fought to defend, Bloodsport indiscriminately slaughtered dozens of innocent people. In his first clash with Superman, Bloodsport severely weakened him with a Kryptonite bullet. After receiving medical aid, Superman confronted Bloodsport once more. Even Luthor, outraged by Bloodsport's murders of so many people due to the attention this would attract to his assault, attempted to stop the mad killer. Superman succeeded in causing the teleportation device Bloodsport used to bring weapons to himself to malfunction. Bloodsport then threatened to detonate his teleporter's power pack, blowing up ten square miles of the city. Superman's friend Jimmy Olsen had learned of Bloodsport's true identity and located his brother. Confronted by Michael, Bloodsport collapsed in grief and was taken into custody.

DuBois has a brief encounter with Deadshot, which was eventually broken up by Superman and Batman. He also appeared in JLA/Avengers as a villain who ambushes Vision and Aquaman with a group of other villains. He later fights Steel, but is restrained by Hal Jordan. DuBois remained in prison for several years, and eventually earned the enmity of another prisoner on Stryker's Island who had since taken up the name Bloodsport: Alexander Trent. As racial tension began to overwhelm Stryker's Island, the prison warden decided to host a boxing match between DuBois and Trent. He believed that this was the ideal way to allow the inmates to vent their frustrations without inciting further acts of violence. To safeguard the situation, the warden asked Superman to referee the match. The riot broke out, resulting in DuBois getting his hands on one of Trent's weapons and using it to blast a hole in the prison wall. DuBois ran for freedom, but was apparently shot dead by armed prison guards in the watchtower.

Infinite Frontier
Following the events of Dark Nights: Death Metal, DuBois was reintroduced back into the DC Universe. After his brother's death, his mental state deteriorated, leading him to become the mercenary Bloodsport. After failing to kill Superman, he was sent to Belle Reve until he was forced into the Suicide Squad with the task of exploring the Multiverse for Amanda Waller's own personal ambitions.

Alexander Trent

The character of Alex Trent is a fanatical racist, a member of the white supremacist group that both Perry White and Franklin Stern encountered in their youth. He adopts the name Bloodsport, ironically used previously by an African American. He also has a similar teleporter grafted into his body, which he can likewise use to summon weapons. He is captured by Superman after Ron Troupe destroys the warehouse from which he was teleporting his weapons. Some time later, in an effort to provide an outlet for rising tensions at Stryker's Island Prison, a boxing match between the two Bloodsports is organised. Trent is able to activate his teleporter and bring in weaponry. In the resulting confusion, DuBois is killed while trying to escape. Trent is later burned in his prison cell by the Brotherhood for showing weakness in front of DuBois. The teleporter technology has since been used by the anti-corporate vigilante Demolitia.

Third version

An unknown character took up the mantle of Bloodsport, and eventually teamed up with Hellgrammite, Silver Banshee, Kryptonite Man, Toyman, Puzzler, Livewire and Riot to take on Superman. Superman attempted to stop all the villains, especially as Bloodsport shot at Jimmy Olsen, to which the bullet was stopped. After these events, Bloodsport turned up in the crowd of villains transported to another planet in Salvation Run; and to be a quickly defeated menace by Guardian.

Characterization

Personality
DuBois pretends that he is a bitter Vietnam veteran who feels greatly betrayed and rejected by his country, thus he enjoys powerful and righteous anger toward his fellow Americans for wasting the freedoms invading Vietnam supposedly helped preserve. However, he has no first-hand experience about this war, ergo, his speeches and character are largely drawn from movies about the war and folk representations of Vietnam War veterans. Though at first he seemed aware that his vet persona was fictional, he grew increasingly delusional and dissociated. Described as a very violent and powerful man, DuBois was plunged into a permanent fantasy about being a soldier, and was even feared by the other dangerous prisoners at Stryker's Island Prison in Metropolis.

Powers and abilities
While Robert DuBois has no superhuman powers, he has proven to be a formidable hand-to-hand combatant when needed due to his excellent physical condition and his fearlessness as a fighter. He's in possession of a device that enables him to teleport high-tech weaponry to him from a distant location instantaneously, with many being one-of-a-kind prototypes from advanced LexCorp research projects. Superman has described the arsenal to be "extradimensional" in both quality and quantity.

He is incredibly strong and significantly more durable than the average human, as evidenced by his survival of several physical altercations with Superman. DuBois' reflexes and senses are extraordinarily keen and allow him to respond to Deadshot and alarm Superman. He's a quick and accurate shooter with a wide variety of firearms, from handguns to shoulder-fired weapons. He's a fully ambidextrous marksman, and can shoot with either hand without any loss of accuracy or speed. On top of his sheer size and musculature, the insane DuBois seems to have a significant level of manic strength and intensity: In a boxing match, he stood toe-to-toe with Alexander Trent, a man with borderline superhuman strength and reflexes.

In other media

Television 
 The Robert DuBois incarnation of Bloodsport makes non-speaking appearances in Justice League Unlimited. He has a minor appearance in the episode "The Cat and the Canary" as a participant in Roulette's Meta-Brawl, and is a member of Gorilla Grodd's Secret Society in the episode "The Great Brain Robbery". During the episode "Alive!", Grodd mounts a mutiny against Lex Luthor for control of the Society; Bloodsport initially sides with Grodd, but later defects to Luthor's side before he and several others are killed by Darkseid. 
 An original character based on Bloodsport named Van McNulty appears in the Smallville episode "Extinction" and "Asylum", portrayed by Jesse Metcalfe. This version manufactured Kryptonite bullets.
 The Robert DuBois incarnation of Bloodsport appears in the Supergirl episode "Girl of Steel", portrayed by David St. Louis. This version was originally part of the military until he was caught stealing weaponry and became a mercenary and terrorist.

Film 

 A hybridized incarnation of Bloodsport appears in Justice League vs. the Fatal Five, voiced by Tom Kenny. An amalgam of Alexander Trent and Robert DuBois, this version is a deranged conspiracy theorist rather than a white supremacist.
 The Robert DuBois incarnation of Bloodsport appears in the DC Extended Universe (DCEU) film The Suicide Squad, portrayed by Idris Elba. This version is a Black British mercenary armed with a high-tech suit and collapsible weapons that only he can use, who is serving time in prison for shooting Superman with a Kryptonite bullet. Additionally, he has a daughter named Tyla (portrayed by Storm Reid).

Video games 
The Robert DuBois incarnation of Bloodsport, inspired by the DCEU incarnation, appears as an outfit in Fortnite Battle Royale.

See also
 List of Superman enemies

References

External links
 Bloodsport (Robert DuBois) at DC Comics Wiki
 Bloodsport (Alexander Trent) at DC Comics Wiki
 Bloodsport III at DC Comics Wiki

Articles about multiple fictional characters
Comics characters introduced in 1987
Comics characters introduced in 1993
Comics characters introduced in 2006
Characters created by John Byrne (comics)
Characters created by Karl Kesel
Characters created by Geoff Johns
DC Comics male supervillains
Fictional African-American people
Fictional murderers
Fictional mass murderers
Fictional torturers
Fictional marksmen and snipers
Fictional mercenaries in comics
Fictional Vietnam War veterans
Superman characters
Male characters in film
Superhero television characters
DC Comics neo-Nazis
Fictional members of secret societies
Fictional characters with post-traumatic stress disorder
Male film villains
Action film villains
DC Comics adapted into films
DC Comics film characters
DC Comics television characters
Suicide Squad members
Vigilante characters in comics